Henry Carl Waechter (born February 13, 1959) is a former American football defensive end and defensive tackle in the National Football League (NFL) for the Chicago Bears, Baltimore/Indianapolis Colts, and Washington Redskins.

Biography
Waechter was born in Epworth, Iowa. He played college football for Waldorf College, where he was an All-American, before transferring to the University of Nebraska, with his younger brother Kevin serving as his teammate at the latter. He was drafted in the seventh round of the 1982 NFL Draft.

Waechter played for the Chicago Bears in 1982, 1984 and 1986. He played for the Baltimore/Indianapolis Colts in 1983 and 1984, and the Washington Redskins in 1987.

Waechter is a member of the 1985 Bears that won Super Bowl XX. He scored the game's final points on a sack of New England Patriots quarterback Steve Grogan in the end zone for a safety.

References

External links
NFL Enterprises LLC: Henry Waechter Profile
DatabaseFootball.com: Henry Waechter Profile

1959 births
Living people
American football defensive linemen
Baltimore Colts players
Chicago Bears players
Indianapolis Colts players
Nebraska Cornhuskers football players
Washington Redskins players
Waldorf Warriors football players
People from Epworth, Iowa
Players of American football from Iowa
National Football League replacement players